The Budapest Blax Lacrosse Egyesület is the first Hungarian lacrosse team.

History
In February 2008, a couple of enthusiastic young people led by Ferenc Sződy started to work on spreading the sport of lacrosse in Hungary. The Budapest Blax were founded in March 2008, and were actively practising in April. In May, European Lacrosse Federation president Peter J. Mundy  traveled to Budapest to hold a clinic. The team’s size grew considerably over the summer months. By November, the team was able to host a friendly match against Bratislava, Slovakia's Bratislava Bats. The Slovakian club was much more experienced and won the game easily.

In 2009, the club continued to expand. In March of that year, the Blax traveled to Bratislava for a tournament, where they faced off against the Bratislava Bats once again, as well as the Vienna Cherokees. The Blax finished the tournament in third place.

Despite having little experience, the Blax maintained a good relationship with the Austrian Lacrosse Federation and received permission to participate in the Austrian Lacrosse League in 2009. The team played throughout the summer, and had the opportunity to host a playoff game in September. The Blax finished their inaugural season in 6th place. This relatively successful first season resulted in the team being offered a permanent spot in the Australian Lacrosse League.
 
In January 2010, Budapest hosted the New Years Cup, hosting teams from across Europe including the Graz Gladiators (Austria), the Vienna White Coats (Austria), and the Ljubljana Dragons (Slovenia).

Data

Date of foundation
16 March 2008

Board
 Sződy, Ferenc - President
Gazsó, Tamás - Vice-President
Elekes, Rita - Women's lacrosse
Urbán, Dávid - Marketing/PR
Kovács, Attila - Youth training

Website
www.budapestblax.hu

Results
 2008: Friendly game defeat
 2009:
 * Friendly tournament in Bratislava: 3rd place
 * Austrian Lacrosse League: 6th place
 2010:
 * New Years Cup Budapest: 4th place
 * Austrian Lacrosse League: 5th place

See also
Federation of International Lacrosse
History of lacrosse
Sport in Budapest
Sport in Hungary
2016 European Lacrosse Championship

References
Francesco's Sports (Hungarian),
Website of the Hungarian Lacrosse Federation,
Sportgéza (Hungarian),
Website of the Nagy Sportágválasztó (Hungarian),
Nemzeti Sport Online (online version of the National Sports newspaper) (Hungarian),
MiTörtént.hu (event collections website) (Hungarian),
Szabadban (event collections website).

External links
 Official website

Lacrosse teams in Europe
Lacrosse in Hungary
Sports teams in Hungary
2008 establishments in Hungary
Lacrosse clubs established in 2008